Margaret Campbell Barnes (27 February 1891 – 1 April 1963) was an English writer of short-stories and historical fiction.

Biography
Margaret Campbell Wood was born on 27 February 1891 in Rotherfield, England, UK. She was the youngest of ten children. She grew up in the Sussex countryside and was educated in private schools in London and Paris. She started writing early in her life even before she met and married George Alfred Campbell Barnes in 1917. She worked as a buyer of silent films and translated film titles for an agency, Curtis Brown Ltd. She also did some travel writing.

She published numerous short stories over the next 25 years in several magazines. During World War II she served as an ambulance driver in the streets of London. In 1944 at the behest of her agent, she started writing historical novels. By the time of her death she had completed ten books. Many were bestsellers and all told about 2 million copies have been sold.

Barnes and her husband raised two sons, one of whom was killed fighting in France in 1944. The loss affected her deeply and influenced some of her later writing. In 1945 the couple bought a cottage on the Isle of Wight and she lived there until she died in 1963.

Works
 Within The Hollow Crown (1941)
 Brief Gaudy Hour (1944)
 Like Us, They Lived (1944) (also titled: The Passionate Brood, and dedicated to her dead son )
 My Lady Of Cleves, (1946)  (also titled: The King's Choice)
 With All My Heart, (1951)
 The Tudor Rose, (1953)
 Mary Of Carisbrooke, (1956)
 Isabel The Fair, (1957)
 King's Fool, (1959)
 The King's Bed, (1962)
 Lady On The Coin, (1963) (with Hebe Elsna)
 
Source:

References

External links
 
 Book Reviews

1891 births
1962 deaths
20th-century English novelists
English women novelists
Writers from Sussex
People from Rotherfield
20th-century English women writers